The Golden Week, in the People's Republic of China, is the name given to three separate 7-day or 8-day national holidays which were implemented in 2000:
Chunyun, the Golden Week around the Chinese New Year, begins in January or February.
 The "National Day Golden Week" begins around October 1. If Mid-Autumn Festival is near National Day, the Golden Week may be 8 days long.
The "Labor Day (May Day) Golden Week" begins May 1 and was reintroduced in 2019 after discontinuation in 2007.

Three or four (if Mid-Autumn Festival is near National Day) days of paid leave are given, and surrounding weekends rescheduled so that workers always have seven or eight continuous days off. These national holidays were first started by the government for the PRC's National Day in 1999, and are primarily intended to help expand the domestic tourism market and improve the national standard of living, as well as allowing people to make long-distance family visits. The Golden Weeks are consequently periods of greatly heightened travel activity.

Statistics

Controversy and evolution
In 2004, there were calls to shorten Golden Week's duration due to its disruption of the regular economy.

In 2006, delegates to the Chinese People's Political Consultative Conference brought up proposals to cancel both the National Day and May Day Golden Weeks, arguing that the holidays have not achieved significant results in promoting internal consumption, which was the original intention for these long holiday weeks. Rather, the delegates said, these Golden Weeks have disrupted people's regular 5-day weekly schedule and is increasingly impeding commerce and international trade, as many key government agencies, especially those related to customs, tax/tariff collection, and legal affairs, are shut down for seven days. Instead, they proposed, these days off should be spread out to other traditional holidays not currently recognized as public holidays, including Mid-Autumn Festival, Dragon Boat Festival, and Qingming Festival. Golden Weeks were sustained as weekly holidays through 2007.

On December 16, 2007, China's official Xinhua News Agency reported that the Chinese population was to have a further three national holidays and lose only one of its golden weeks, the May Day holiday, according to the calendar reform that the government has approved. May Day itself now became a one-day holiday. Three traditional festivals—Mid-Autumn Festival, Dragon Boat Festival, and Qingming Festival—were added to the list of public holidays. The Chinese New Year and National Day would remain three-day holidays, though in the Chinese New Year extra holiday days are de facto added by adjusting the weekend days before and after the three days holiday, resulting in a full week of public holiday. According to Xinhua, with this calendar revision, the Chinese government aimed to recover the customs associated with traditional festivals and balance tourist demand during the weeks of holidays. In practice, the new calendar, which came into force on January 1, 2008, would increase national holidays from 10 to 11 days. A spokesperson for the National Commission for Development and Reform said that the new plan would ratify Chinese traditions, better distribute holidays and prevent the "overcrowding" of the "golden weeks" when more people travel during the new holidays and during the periods of paid holidays.

In 2020, the Chinese government reported that more than 637 million people traveled within China, creating around 466 billion yuan ($68.6 billion) in tourism revenue, during their country's annual "Golden Week", despite being in the midst of the COVID-19 pandemic.

See also 
 Balik Kampung (equivalent in Malaysia)
 Chunyun
 Golden Week in Japan
 Holidays in the People's Republic of China

Notes and references

External links 

Public holidays in China
Weeks